
Aubert Aviation (later, SA des avions P. Aubert) was a French aircraft manufacturing company established in 1932 by Paul Aubert at Issy-les-Moulineaux. In 1938, it flew a light monoplane, the Cigale, and continued to develop this design after World War II at Buc, building some 30 production examples before ceasing operations in 1959.

References
 
 aviafrance.com

Defunct aircraft manufacturers of France
Vehicle manufacturing companies established in 1932
Vehicle manufacturing companies disestablished in 1959
French companies established in 1932
1959 disestablishments in France